George Lindley (1866 - 19 June 1937) was a member of the Queensland Legislative Assembly.

Biography
Lindley was born in Melbourne, Victoria, the son of Anthony Bray Lindley and his wife Elizabeth (née Lockington). After arriving in Queensland he worked on his father's pastoral pursuits at Curra, Tiaro and Wide Bay before establishing an auctioneering business in Brisbane in 1903. He then was a real estate agent, working out of Toowoomba.

On 7 October 1896, Lindley married Mary Helen Dawson (died 1951) and together had three sons and one daughter. He died in June of 1937 and was buried in the Presbyterian section of the Drayton and Toowoomba Cemetery.

Public life
At the 1902 Queensland state elections, Lindley won the seat of Wide Bay, defeating the sitting member, Charles Jenkinson. He held the seat until he decided not to stand in 1907.

References

Members of the Queensland Legislative Assembly
Politicians from Melbourne
1866 births
1937 deaths